The Cropredy Box is an album by Fairport Convention recorded at their annual live concert in Cropredy, Oxfordshire, England to celebrate the band's thirtieth anniversary in 1997. Featuring many songs for which the band had become noted, the set also features performances from many former members including violinist Dave Swarbrick, original vocalist Judy Dyble, and Ralph McTell. Commentary is provided by their first manager, Joe Boyd, and Ashley Hutchings.

The album was packaged as three-CD boxed set including a booklet which featured a description of the compilation by Simon Nicol, track listings, and photographs from the concert itself. Extras were a track recorded for a Ken Russell documentary film about traditional music, and a prank phone call to Dave Swarbrick which had circulated on tape amongst the band's fans for many years.

Track listing

Disc one 
 "Intro" - Rory McLeod introduces Joe Boyd (4:56)
 "Wings" (Hutchings, Nicol) (4:30)
 "Jack O'Diamonds" (vocals- Judy Dyble) (Carruthers, Dylan) (3:37)
 "Time Will Show the Wiser" (Emitt Rhodes) (3:14)
 "Mr. Lacey" (vocals - Vikki Clayton) (Hutchings) (3:11)
 "Suzanne" (Cohen) (7:05)
 "Genesis Hall" (Thompson) (3:51)
 "Million Dollar Bash" (Dylan, Hutchings) (4:27)
 "Come all Ye" (Denny, Hutchings) (5:23)
 "Reynardine" (Traditional) (3:57)
 "Matty Groves" (Traditional) (7:38)

Disc two 
 "Danny Boy" (Traditional arr. spontaneously) (3:11)
 "Intro" - Ashley Hutchings (8:24)
 "Walk Awhile" (Thompson, Swarbrick) (4:29)
 "Now Be Thankful" (Thompson, Swarbrick) (3:49)
 "Poor Will and the Jolly Hangman" (Thompson, Swarbrick) (7:32)
 "Angel Delight" (Swarbrick, Pegg, Nicol, Mattacks) (4:38)
 "Rain" (Lennon, McCartney) (vocals - Dan Ar Braz) (7:30)
 "Cut Across Shorty" (Wilkin, Walker) (5:41)
 "Sloth" (Thompson, Swarbrick) (13:06)
 "Rosie" (Swarbrick) (6:02)
 "Solo" (Denny) (vocals - Cathy LeSurf) (5:23)

Disc three 
 "John Barleycorn" (Traditional) (11:29)
 "Wat Tyler" (McTell, Nicol) (6:37)
 "Red and Gold" (McTell) (6:56)
 "Jewel in the Crown" (Julie Matthews) (4:13)
 "Woodworm Swing" (Sanders) (5:10)
 "John Gaudie" (incl. "John Gaudie", "Jack Brook Da Prison Door", "Donald Blue" & "The Bonnie Isle O'Whalsay") (Trad. arr Chris Leslie) (5:38)
 "Fiddlestix" (Trad. arr Swarbrick) (3:09)
 "Dirty Linen" (Trad. arr Swarbrick) (6:36)
 "Si Tu Dois Partir" (Dylan) (4:10)
 "Meet on the Ledge" (Thompson) (7:31)

Bonus tracks 
 "Seventeen Come Sunday" (Trad. arr Nicol, Pegg, Mattacks, Sanders, Leslie Westbury, Woodworm) (3:07)
 "The April Fool Tape" (5:23)
 participants: Sergeant McLeod played by Simon Nicol, Mrs Gloria Swarbrick, David Swarbrick

Personnel 

 Simon Nicol - Vocals, Acoustic & Electric Guitars
 Richard Thompson - Vocals, Electric Guitar
 Ashley Hutchings - Vocals, Bass Guitar
 Dave Mattacks - Drums
 Judy Dyble - Vocals, Recorder
 Dave Swarbrick - Fiddle, Mandolin, Vocals
 Dave Pegg - Bass Guitar, Vocals
 Dan Ar Braz - Electric Guitar, Vocals
 Chris Leslie - Vocals, Batocaster!, Bouzouki, Mandolin
 Maartin Allcock - Keyboards, Vocals, Electric Guitar, Acoustic Guitar
 Jerry Donahue - Electric Guitar
 Bruce Rowland - Tambourine
 Ric Sanders - Violin, Keyboards

Additional vocals

 Vikki Clayton
 Ralph McTell
 Cathy Lesurf
 Martin Carthy
 Norma Waterson
 Chris While
 Julie Matthews
 Heather Wood
 Gill Allcock
 Jacqui McShee
 Danny Thompson Jnr

References 
 [ Allmusic]
 
 Fairport Convention fansite description

Fairport Convention albums
1999 live albums